Saša Sviben (born 10 January 1973) is a Slovenian former road cyclist, who competed as a professional from 1998 to 2003.

Major results

1997
 National Road Championships
1st  Road race
1st  Time trial
 3rd Overall Tour de Pologne
1998
 1st GP Puch Ptuj
 8th Overall Tour de Slovénie
 8th Overall Tour de Normandie
1999
 2nd Time trial, National Road Championships
 5th Overall GP Kranj
2000
 2nd Raiffeisen Grand Prix
 2nd GP Krka
 2nd Völkermarkter Radsporttage
2001
 1st Kettler Classic-Südkärnten
 1st Giro del Medio Brenta
 National Road Championships
2nd Time trial
4th Road race
 3rd Overall Sachsen-Tour
 3rd Criterium d'Abruzzo
 3rd Lavanttaler Radsporttage
 5th Overall UNIQA Classic
 5th Trophy Riviera II
2002
 1st Rund um die Hainleite
 2nd Road race, National Road Championships
 8th Ronde van Drenthe
2003
 4th Road race, National Road Championships

References

External links

1973 births
Living people
Slovenian male cyclists
Sportspeople from Celje